Nasir Khan Afridi is a Pakistani politician who had been a member of the National Assembly of Pakistan from June 2013 to May 2018.

He is brother of Haji Momin Khan Afridi.

Political career
He was elected to the National Assembly of Pakistan as an independent candidate from Constituency NA-46 (Tribal Area-XI) in 2013 Pakistani general election. He received 4,135 votes and defeated Muhammad Iqbal Khan, a candidate of Pakistan Tehreek-e-Insaf.

In 2014, an election tribunal declared  the election null and void and ordered a re-election in the constituency. His National Assembly membership was later restored by the court.

References

Living people
Pashtun people
Pakistani MNAs 2013–2018
People from Khyber Pakhtunkhwa
Year of birth missing (living people)